Henry Summers may refer to:

Hal Summers (Henry Forbes Summers, 1911–2005), British civil servant and poet
Henry Summers, pseudonym used by actor Ed Wynn
Henry Summers, fictional character in That Other Woman
Henry Summers, co-owner of John Summers & Sons
Henry M. Summers (died 1865), acting mayor of New Orleans in 1858

See also
Harry Summers (disambiguation)
Henry Lee Summer (born 1955), American musician
Hank Summers, character in Buffy the Vampire Slayer